Toy box, Toy Box, or Toybox may refer to:

 a box for storing toys

Television and film
 Toybox (TV series), an Australian children's television series
 The Toy Box, a 2017 American reality television series
 The Toybox, a 2018 American supernatural thriller film
 DS-12 Toy Box, the protagonists' ship in the science fiction manga and anime series Planetes

Music
 Toy-Box, a Danish pop group
 "Toy Box", song by horrorcore group Insane Clown Posse
 Toybox Records, a record label that existed from 1992 to 1997

Other
 Officer Robyn "Toybox" Slinger, a fictional character in the comic book series Top 10
 Toybox, a suite of Linux command line utilities
 Toybox, a feature in the sandbox physics game Garry's Mod
 Toybox Turbos, a 2014 racing video game
 Toys "R" Us, who opened pop up stores known as "Geoffrey's Toy Box"
 The Toy Box, your giant customizable world of imagination in the Disney Infinity series

See also
 Box of Toys, a British new wave band
 David Parker Ray, also known as the "Toy-Box Killer", a suspected American serial killer